James Lumbers (born 1929) is a Canadian artist. Originally from Toronto, Ontario, he now lives on Georgian Bay, in Ontario. He is known for his wilderness landscapes, nostalgic images of Canada's past, and portraits, including his heritage Moments in Time series combining historical photographs and records with present-day imagery to create historical tributes.

In 1973 Lumbers was elected a Fellow of the Explorers Club of New York, and also became a member of the New York Society of Animal Artists. He has been included in Who's Who in American Art and a Dictionary of International Biographies in the United Kingdom.

In 1991, Lumbers established a publishing company to publish his work and the work of other Canadian artists. In 1993 a book was published collecting his work up to that time.

References

1929 births
Living people
20th-century Canadian painters
Canadian male painters
21st-century Canadian painters
Artists from Toronto
Fellows of the Explorers Club
20th-century Canadian male artists
21st-century Canadian male artists